Yevgeniy Aleksandrovich Velichko (born 2 April 1987, in Shchuchinsk) is a Kazakhstani cross-country skier. He represented Kazakhstan at the 2010 Winter Olympics in Vancouver.

At the 2010 Games, Velichko earned his best finish of 11th in the 4 x 10 km relay.

References

External links
 
 
 
 Лыжный сайт города Щучинска

1987 births
Cross-country skiers at the 2010 Winter Olympics
Cross-country skiers at the 2014 Winter Olympics
Cross-country skiers at the 2018 Winter Olympics
Cross-country skiers at the 2022 Winter Olympics
Living people
Kazakhstani male cross-country skiers
Tour de Ski skiers
Olympic cross-country skiers of Kazakhstan
Asian Games medalists in cross-country skiing
Cross-country skiers at the 2011 Asian Winter Games
Asian Games gold medalists for Kazakhstan
Medalists at the 2011 Asian Winter Games
People from Akmola Region
Universiade silver medalists for Kazakhstan
Universiade medalists in cross-country skiing
Competitors at the 2015 Winter Universiade
21st-century Kazakhstani people